The Sports Technology and Innovation Group is a quango advisory group set up in September 2020 by the UK government.

History
In early November 2020, the Premier League "and other sporting bodies" were close to agreement with the government on the implementation of a "digital health passport", which would admit only COVID-19 vaccinated fans into stadiums. The German "freedom pass" and "app-based system" discrimination would be the ticket for clubs to re-open their premises. The Premier League "welcomed the potential breakthrough" as they continued to "work closely" with the Sports Technology and Innovation Group under Culture Secretary Oliver Dowden and Sports Minister Nigel Huddleston.

References

Emergency management in the United Kingdom
Organizations established for the COVID-19 pandemic
Public bodies and task forces of the United Kingdom government
Cultural organisations based in the United Kingdom
Sports organisations of the United Kingdom
Advocacy groups in the United Kingdom
Government agencies established in 2020